Jaco Fourie is a South African equestrian athlete and SA National Champion in dressage. He lives near Kimberley, South Africa in the Northern Cape, on a Kalahari farm.  He appeared on the cover of the May 2007 edition of the SA Horseman Magazine. He married Magda Fourie in 2009 and together they have 2 daughters, Hanneke and Adelinde and a son Andrè Fourie.  The couple own and manage Areion Warmblood Horses & Dressage Academy. His wife, Magda, died on 26 July 2019 and he has been a single father ever since.

Riding career

Jaco Fourie started his riding career in the family business of his father and 2 brothers at the age of 4, and was tutored and mentored by many riding professionals to young adulthood. He had training from bereiters and instructors from the Spanish Riding School in Vienna, the SA Lipizzaner Centre, Natalie Hobday and Jonny Hilberath (GER).

His first Free State Provincial Colours were awarded in 2003, and received his National Protea Colours for dressage in 2007. Fourie has represented his home-country, South Africa in the Equestrian Tri-Nations Competition on two occasions in 2007 and 2008 in Hawke's Bay, New Zealand. He won the SA Championships in 2006, 2007 and 2008. He also won the FEI World Dressage Challenge in 2005. He is the leading South African rider in the South African National Equestrian Federation's dressage rankings.

He worked full-time as stud manager for CALLAHO Warmblood Sport Horses, a South African based horse breeding stud farm, who is also a major sponsor of international riders, but has since moved onto his own property where he owns & manages Areion Warmblood Horses & Dressage Academy. He has subsequently followed a parallel career as equestrian dressage coach, and coach developer for the South African Equestrian Federation, designated as National Coach Education Advisor (NCEA) by SASCA in 2020.

Horses
His first pony was a crossbred Welsh pony named Prins. In dressage, Fourie rode CALLAHO's For Joy, CALLAHO's Granulit, CALLAHO's Rosengirl, CALLAHO's Benicio and AREION's Deja Vu to National honours.  However, he had various other successes with horses FD Ref's Asterix, Etherow Impasse, Brandenburg Super C, Alzu Catapault, Kehilan Shaheer, Orly and Kingsdale Kildaire amongst others. His current rising star is a Hanoverian stallion "FHM" whom he is training in dressage.

References

External links
CALLAHO Warmblood Sport Horses
South African National Equestrian Federation
Free State & Northern Cape Horse Society
Areion Warmblood Horses & Dressage Academy

1975 births
Living people
Sportspeople from Pretoria
South African male equestrians
South African dressage riders